Pozdeň is a municipality and village in Kladno District in the Central Bohemian Region of the Czech Republic. It has about 500 inhabitants.

Administrative parts
The village of Hřešice is an administrative part of Pozdeň.

References

Villages in Kladno District